The Cavour IV government was the first cabinet of the Kingdom of Italy. It held office from 23 March until 12 June 1861, a total of 81 days, or 2 months and 20 days.

History
In 1861, Victor Emmanuel II declared the Kingdom of Italy, making Cavour officially Prime Minister of Italy. Cavour had many difficult issues to consider, including how to create a national military, which legal institutions should be retained in what locations, and especially the future of Rome. Most Italians thought Rome must be the capital of a united Italy, but this conflicted with the temporal power of the Pope and also the independence of the Church. Cavour believed that Rome should remain the seat of "a free church in a free state", which would maintain its independence but give up temporal power. Still Austrian Venetia was also a problem. Cavour recognized that Venice must be an integral part of Italy but refused to take a stance on how to achieve it, saying "Will the deliverance of Venice come by arms or diplomacy? I do not know. It is the secret of Providence." A motion approving of his foreign policy passed by a huge majority, basically only opposed by left-wing and right-wing extremist groups.

Creating Italy was no easy task, but ruling it proved a worse strain on the Prime Minister. In 1861, at the peak of his career, months of long days coupled with insomnia and constant worry took their toll on Cavour. He fell ill, presumably of malaria, and to make matters worse insisted upon being bled. His regular doctor would have refused, but he was not available; so Cavour was bled several times until it was nearly impossible to draw any blood from him. He was buried in Santena, near Turin.

Government parties
The government was composed by the following parties:

Composition

References

Italian governments
1861 establishments in Italy
1861 disestablishments in Italy